Sambo was part of the World Games in 1985 in London and again in 1993 in The Hague.

Medalist

Men

−52 kg

−57 kg

−62 kg

−68 kg

−74 kg

−82 kg

−90 kg

−100 kg

+100 kg

Women

−48 kg

−52 kg

−56 kg

−60 kg

−64 kg

−68 kg

−72 kg

−80 kg

External links
 World Games at Sports123 by Internet Archive

Sports at the World Games
Sambo at multi-sport events